Baba Faraj Tabrizi (died 1172/73) was an Iranian Sufi shaykh ("master") of the 12th century. He is also known as Gajili, due to his khaniqah (Sufi lodge) and tomb being situated in the Gajil district of Tabriz.

He is known to have spoken the northwestern Iranian vernacular of Tabrizi.

References

Sources 
 
 

Year of birth unknown
1170s deaths
12th-century Iranian people